The Markanda is a river in the Indian states of Himachal Pradesh and Haryana. It is a tributary of the Ghaggar river, flowing through Sirmaur District, Ambala district and Shahabad Markanda, a town in Kurukshetra district. The Markanda river's ancient name was Aruna.

Origin and route
The Markanda river is an eponymous seasonal river in Haryana state, which is a main tributary of the Ghaggar River.

The Markanda river originates in the Shivalik hills on the border of Haryana and Himachal Pradesh State, and flows along the haryana and Punjab, India border before meeting with Ghaggar river at the confluence.

The basin is classified in two parts, Khadir and Bangar, the higher area that is not flooded in rainy season is called Bangar and the lower flood-prone area is called Khadar.

Several archaeologists identify the old Ghaggar-Hakra River as the Sarasvati river, on the banks of which the Indus Valley civilisation developed.

Gallery

See also 

 Dangri, a tributary of Sarsuti 
 Tangri river, a tributary of Sarsuti, merge if Dangri and Tangri are same 
 Sarsuti, a tributary of Ghaggar-Hakra River 
 Kaushalya river, a tributary of Ghaggar-Hakra River
 Chautang, a tributary of Ghaggar-Hakra River
 Sutlej, a tributary of Indus
 Ganges
 Indus
 Western Yamuna Canal, branches off Yamuna

References

External links 

Sarasvati-Sindhu civilization and Sarasvati River
The Saraswati: Where lies the mystery by Saswati Paik

Rivers of Himachal Pradesh
Rivers of Haryana
Rivers of Punjab, India
Rigvedic rivers
Indus basin
International rivers of Asia
Sarasvati River
Archaeological sites in Haryana
Indus Valley civilisation sites
Rivers of India